Timsales Football Club  is an association football club based in Elburgon, Kenya. They currently compete in FKF Division One, the third tier of the Kenyan football league system.

The team is owned by Kenyan wood manufacturing company Timsales Limited.

References 

FKF Division One clubs
Football clubs in Kenya